Julia Roberts is an American actress and producer who made her debut in the 1987 direct-to-video feature Firehouse. She had her breakthrough the following year by starring in the coming-of-age film Mystic Pizza (1988). For her supporting role in the comedy-drama Steel Magnolias (1989), she won the Golden Globe Award for Best Supporting Actress. Roberts' next role was opposite Richard Gere in the highly successful romantic comedy Pretty Woman (1990), for which she won the Golden Globe Award for Best Actress (Musical or Comedy). In 1991, she appeared in the psychological thriller Sleeping with the Enemy, and played Tinker Bell in the Steven Spielberg-directed fantasy adventure Hook. Two years later, Roberts starred in the legal thriller The Pelican Brief, an adaptation of the John Grisham novel of the same name. During the late 1990s, she played the lead in the romantic comedies My Best Friend's Wedding (1997), Notting Hill (1999), and Runaway Bride (1999).

In 2000, Roberts became the first actress to earn $20 million, for playing the eponymous environmental activist in the Steven Soderbergh-directed biographical film Erin Brockovich. Her performance won her the Academy Award for Best Actress, the BAFTA Award for Best Actress in a Leading Role, and the Golden Globe Award for Best Actress (Drama). The following year, she starred in the romantic comedy America's Sweethearts (2001), and reteamed with Soderbergh on the comedy heist remake Ocean's Eleven (2001). Roberts appeared in the 2003 drama, Mona Lisa Smile, which earned her a then record $25 million salary. The following year, she starred in the romantic drama Closer (2004), and also reprised her role in the sequel, Ocean's Twelve (2004). In 2006, she lent her voice to two animated films: The Ant Bully, and Charlotte's Web. Roberts went on to appear in the comedy-dramas Charlie Wilson's War (2007) and Eat Pray Love (2010), following which she starred in August: Osage County (2013), for which she was nominated for the Academy Award for Best Supporting Actress. In 2016, Roberts played a television producer in the thriller Money Monster and the following year, she played a mother coping with her son's Treacher Collins syndrome in the comedy-drama Wonder.

Roberts made her television debut in the drama series Crime Story in 1987. She appeared in the crime drama series Miami Vice, and the television film Baja Oklahoma (both in 1988). In 1996, Roberts guest starred on the television sitcom Friends. Her guest star appearance on the police procedural/legal drama Law & Order in 1999, earned Roberts a nomination for the Primetime Emmy Award for Outstanding Guest Actor in a Drama Series. She has, as of 2014, served as an executive producer on four films in the American Girl film series. The first three were television films while the fourth, Kit Kittredge: An American Girl, had a theatrical release in 2008. In 2014, Roberts provided narration for an episode of the documentary series Makers: Women Who Make America, and appeared in the film The Normal Heart. Her role in the latter earned Roberts a nomination for the Primetime Emmy Award for Outstanding Supporting Actress in a Miniseries or a Movie.

Film

Television

See also
 List of awards and nominations received by Julia Roberts

References

External links
 

Filmography
Actress filmographies
American filmographies
Director filmographies